The Beanpots is an annual men's and women's ice hockey tournament among the four major US college hockey teams of the Boston, Massachusetts area. The men's tournament is usually held during the first two Mondays in February at TD Garden and the women's tournament rotates hosts between the four schools.  The four teams are the Boston University Terriers (men's 31 championships. women's 2), Boston College Eagles (men's 20 championships, women's 8), Harvard University Crimson (men's 11 championships, women's 15), and Northeastern University Huskies (men's 8 championships, women's 17).  The men's tournament has been held annually since the 1952–53 season and has been held at its current location since 1996, except for 2021 when it was cancelled due to the COVID 19 pandemic.  Northeastern is the current men's Beanpot champion, having won the 2023 tournament. The women's tournament began in 1979, and Northeastern is the 2023 champion.

Due to the success of the hockey tournament, numerous other "Beanpots" have been contested in a number of other sports over the years, usually involving teams from the same four schools.

Format
The competitors are:
Boston University Terriers (55-time finalists, 31-time winners; last championship in 2022)
Boston College Eagles (36-time finalists, 20-time winners; last championship in 2016)
Harvard University Crimson (27-time finalists, 11-time winners; last championship in 2017)
Northeastern University Huskies (23-time finalists, 8-time winners; last championship in 2023)

The tournament lasts two rounds, with first-round opponents being rotated from year to year. The second round features the consolation game and the championship game. 

In addition to the tournament trophy, two individual awards are given out each year. The Eberly Trophy goes to the goaltender with the highest save percentage who plays in both of his team's games, while the Beanpot MVP is awarded to tournament's most valuable player.

Overtime format
In 2020, a rule change was made dictating how any overtime periods were to be handled. Traditionally, a tied score after the end of regulation time would be followed by continuous sudden-death play, in 20-minute intervals. However, due to NCAA regulations governing the way tournament games are factored into pairwise calculation (the formula for determining post-season seeding), a standardized format was required for all mid-season tournaments across collegiate hockey. From 2020 on, all Beanpot games with a tied score after regulation would commence with a 5-minute overtime period, after which if there is no sudden-death score, the game shall be officially ruled a tie. Play may be continued after this 5-minute interval, but any statistics accrued will not be considered official, and the end result of which will be solely for the purpose of determining tournament placement.

The effects of this change were felt immediately, as two games went to the "2nd" overtime period in the 2020 iteration of the tournament. Boston College and Boston University played to a 4–4 tie after five minutes of overtime, and BU emerged victorious in the unofficial 2nd period. The same result and score occurred in that year's Championship match, as Northeastern and Boston University skated to a 4–4 tie after the initial overtime; the Huskies then defeated the Terriers to claim the title.

In 2022, the third instance of the new overtime format came to be, as Boston College and Harvard tied 3–3 after five minutes of overtime in the Consolation game. However, the game was not continued to determine a 3rd place winner, due to time constraints for the playing of the Championship game. In years prior, it would have been necessary to continue play indefinitely, but given the now-unofficial status of doing so, it was deemed no longer prudent. The game was ruled the first - and potentially only - official tie in tournament history.

In 2023, the overtime rules were further amended to require the 5-minute overtime period to be played 3-on-3, rather than with the full 5-on-5 complement. Additionally, the rule was implemented that if matches ended in a tie after the 5-minute overtime, a three-round shootout would be used to determine the winner. The rule came into effect immediately in that year's title game, as Northeastern defeated Harvard 3–2 in a shootout to claim the Beanpot Championship. 

In summary, only three tournament games have an unofficial, or special status. The BC-BU first round meeting and the Northeastern-BU championship from the 2020 tournament both played beyond the 5-minute overtime. As a result, BU and Northeastern each have 1 unofficial goal counted in tournament statistics. Craig Pantano's Eberly Award stat line also includes saves from the additional overtime period of the title game. The only other game with special status was the 2022 Consolation game between BC and Harvard, which simply ended a tie after a scoreless 5-minute overtime. Play was not continued, so no unofficial statistics were recorded. After the 2023 introduction of the shootout to determine a winner for all games, this will be the only official tie in tournament history.

History
The first Beanpot was contested at Boston Arena in December 1952. No tournament was played during the 1953 calendar year. The next two tournaments were held in January (1954 and 1955). All subsequent Beanpot games have been played in February (except 1978; see below).

The tournament quickly outgrew the 4,500 seating capacity of the Boston Arena and the second through 43rd Beanpots (1954 through 1995) were held at the old 14,000 seat Boston Garden. Since 1996, the Beanpot has been held at the Garden's replacement, the 17,500 seat TD Garden. The competition generally takes place on the first and second Mondays in February and often draws one of the largest crowds of the college hockey season outside of the Frozen Four.

The 1978 Beanpot has taken a mythic place in Boston sports lore, as several hundred fans were stuck in the Garden for several days after the Blizzard of 1978 dumped more than two feet of snow during the night of the first-round games. The championship and consolation games were moved to Wednesday, March 1.

Every championship game up until 2023 has featured either Boston College or Boston University. After 70 iterations of the tournament, the Northeastern Huskies and Harvard Crimson finally both emerged victorious in the Semifinal, and played each other for the title. The Huskies defeated the Crimson 3–2 in the tournament's first ever shootout to determine the game's winner, let alone a championship. Conversely, the first meeting between BC and BU in the consolation game occurred, with the Eagles taking the 3rd place finish. 

None of the four competing teams have won the NCAA Division I Men's Ice Hockey Championship without first winning the Beanpot trophy that season. With the exception of the 1949 Boston College Eagles (as the tournament had yet to be created), all five Boston University NCAA championships (1971, 1972, 1978, 1995, 2009), Boston College's four other NCAA championships (2001, 2008, 2010, 2012), and Harvard's sole 1989 NCAA championship, were all accompanied by a victory in the Beanpot title game. Northeastern has not yet won an NCAA championship. This phenomenon has led fans of the Beanpot schools to believe dreams for a national title hold water if they indeed succeed in February. Boston College head coach Jerry York has often referred to the beginning of February as "Trophy Season," in which the Beanpot title is the first of three trophies that he wishes his team to attain, the others being the Hockey East tournament trophy, and the NCAA tournament trophy.

Since the Beanpots' 1952 inception, the team rosters, once dominated by New Englanders and Canadians, have gradually evolved to include a greater cross section of the United States as well as other countries. The 2020 Beanpot included players from Florida, Georgia, Idaho, Nevada, and Texas. Reflecting a trend across college hockey, where 117 European students were playing at the NCAA Division I level in 2020, the Boston University Terriers roster included Kasper Kotkansalo from Finland and Wilmer Skoog from Sweden who scored the winning goal in Boston University's overtime goal in their upset win against Boston College in the 2020 Beanpot semi-final. After the game, Skoog said "It was the biggest game of my life."

Boston University
Between 1966 and 2009, the Boston University Terriers historically dominated the Beanpot, winning 28 out of 43 titles. Owing to this phenomenon, fans have nicknamed the contest the "BU Invitational", an apt name as BU has made it to the title game 55 of 69 years (as of 2022), winning their most recent title in 2022. Despite historical dominance, recent years have been less successful for the Terriers, winning only twice out of eight championship appearances since 2009.

The beginning of BU's Beanpot dominance was also the first year on the ice for Jack Parker. Parker won titles in each of the three years he played for the Terriers, and after taking over as head coach in 1973–74, Parker won 21 more championships.

Boston College

Boston College controlled the early years of the Beanpot, winning eight titles in the first thirteen tournaments. Following BU's dominance, the balance of power tipped back towards the Eagles for about a decade, when they won six titles in seven years between 2010–2016.  During that stretch, BC won five consecutive titles from 2010–2014, losing out in the first round in 2015, and regaining the title in 2016. However, they have failed to secure a title in four consecutive seasons, and only once made the championship game during that time.

Harvard

Harvard shared some success with Boston College in the early years of the tournament, winning four titles in the first 10 years, as well as making the title game each of the first four tournaments and winning the very first title game. However, they have only seen sporadic success since, winning 11 titles in the tournament's history, most recently ending a 24-year championship drought in 2017. They had only made the title game three times since their previous victory in 1993: '94, '98, and '08.

Northeastern

Northeastern, the only Beanpot team that has never won an NCAA hockey title, failed to win a Beanpot until 1980, when an overtime goal by Wayne Turner against Boston College gave the Huskies a win. Turner's wrist shot has often been called the most important goal in Northeastern history, and is generally considered the marquee sporting moment for the university. It is also known as the "Shot Heard Round the Beanpot".

Northeastern won three more titles in the 1980s, but failed to capture the Beanpot for 30 years. The Huskies came close to winning their fifth title in 2005 when they rallied from a 2–0 goal deficit to tie BU, but fell in overtime when Chris Bourque scored the winning goal. They made it to championship game four times from 2011-2015 but fell each time, to Boston College in '11, '13, and '14 and to Boston University in '15.

Northeastern won their drought-breaking championship in 2018 with a dominating 5–2 victory over BU, in a rare year where the Huskies were the strongest team in the field, having come into the tournament ranked highest in the pairwise over the other three Beanpot schools. This would be the case again in 2019, where Northeastern again won the championship with a 4–2 victory over BC. In 2020, the Huskies would win their third straight championship against BU in double overtime, solidifying their legacy as a 21st-century Beanpot dynasty and effectively ending their reputation as the underdogs of the tournament. Before 2018, the Huskies had been to only 17 title games, and won only 4 of those. Earning three championships in a row from 2018-2020 proved their newfound parity with their other Beanpot schools, where they hoped to continue their success in the coming years. In 2022, Northeastern lost their three year streak to BU after a long standoff in the three periods. In 2023, 16th-ranked Northeastern recaptured the Beanpot title by beating 9th ranked Harvard 3–2 in the tournament's first ever shootout, after overtime rules were amended that season. The title was the Huskies' 4th in a span of 5 straight tournament championship game appearances.

Recent tournaments
This section explains in detail the results of the previous five Beanpot tournaments as of February 2020.

2016
The 2016 Beanpot took place on February 1 and 8. The first round of the tournament saw Boston College defeat Harvard 3–2 and Boston University defeat Northeastern 3–1. Northeastern defeated Harvard 5–1 in the consolation game and, for the 22nd time in the history of the tournament, BC and BU competed for the Championship, with the Eagles winning a 1–0 overtime contest. This was BU's second consecutive title game and BC's first since winning five in a row from 2010–2014. Northeastern failed to make the title game for the first time since 2012, whereas Harvard had not been to the title game since 2008. The 1–0 Championship game was the first ever 1–0 result in the history of the tournament. The championship game was also the sixth of the previous eleven title games to go to overtime.

2017
The 2017 Beanpot took place on February 6 and 13. The first round of the tournament saw Harvard defeat Northeastern 4–3 and Boston University defeat Boston College 3–1. Northeastern defeated Boston College 4–2 in the consolation game and Harvard and BU competed for the Championship, with the Crimson winning their 11th title and first since 1993 by a score of 6–3. This was BU's third consecutive title game and Harvard's first since 2008. Boston College's loss to Northeastern placed them 4th for the first time since 1993 and was only their seventh 4th-place finish in tournament history. Harvard's victory also marked the first non-BC or BU title since Harvard's 1993 victory, a 24- year span.

2018
The 2018 Beanpot took place on February 5 and 12. The first round of the tournament saw Northeastern shutout Boston College 3–0 and BU defeat Harvard in double overtime, 3–2. Harvard defeated Boston College 5–4 in overtime of the consolation game and Northeastern met Boston University in the championship, with the Huskies ending their 30-year drought, winning their 5th title and first since 1988, by a score of 5–2. This was BU's fourth consecutive title game and Northeastern's first since going to three straight between 2013–15. BC's loss to Harvard placed them 4th for the second consecutive year, an occurrence that only happened once before in tournament history between 1974–75. The Huskies victory also marked a championship for each tournament school in consecutive years - BU in 2015, BC in 2016, Harvard in 2017, and Northeastern in 2018 - an occurrence that happened only once before between 1980–83.

2019
The 2019 Beanpot took place on February 4 and 11.  The first round of the tournament saw Boston College defeat Harvard 2–1 and Northeastern defeat Boston University 2–1 in overtime. Harvard defeated Boston University 5–2 in the consolation game, and Northeastern defeated Boston College 4–2 in the Championship for their second straight title and 6th overall. This was the second time Northeastern has won back-to-back titles, the first time being in 1984–85. Boston College made their 36th appearance in the Championship, but failed to capture their 21st title.  Boston University finished 4th for just the 7th time in tournament history, with 4 of these having come in the last decade (2011, '13, '14 & '19). Their previous 3 last-place finishes occurred in 1961, '63 & '80. Combined with Harvard's victory in 2017, this also marked the first time in tournament history that three straight tournaments were not won by BU or BC. Two straight seasons without a BU or BC title occurred three times, in '80-'81, '84-'85, and '88-'89.

2020
The 2020 Beanpot took place on February 3 and 10. The first round of the tournament saw Northeastern defeat Harvard 3–1 and Boston University defeat Boston College 5–4 in double overtime.* Boston College defeated Harvard 7–2 in the consolation game, and Northeastern defeated Boston University 5–4 in double overtime* of the Championship for their third straight title and 7th overall. This was the first time in tournament history Northeastern won three straight titles. Boston University made their 54th title appearance, but failed to capture their 31st title. This year's result ties the second longest title drought for BU, having not won since 2015. They previously had a 5-year drought between 2010-14 – when BC won five straight championships – however, their 7-year span during 1959-65 is the most years in a row the Terriers went without the Beanpot title.

New NCAA rules put in place in 2020 meant all tournament games would have a new overtime format, in which a single 5-minute period would be played and then, if still scoreless, continual overtime with 20-minute periods would be played to determine tournament placement. If no score is reached before the 5-minute period ends, the game is considered a tie and all statistics recorded in the additional overtime periods are not counted. This was put in place to standardize tournament results (across the NCAA, not just the Beanpot) for use with the pairwise ranking system, which determines NCAA tournament seeding.

Women's Beanpot (ice hockey) 
Starting in 1979, the Women's Beanpot takes place each year on the first two Tuesdays in February. The first tournament was hosted at Northeastern's Matthews Arena, where the Huskies won 3-1 against Boston College. Northeastern and Harvard have won the majority of tournaments, with 17 and 15 titles, respectively. Boston College follows with 8 championships, then Boston University with 2 and Brown with 1. The Northeastern Huskies are the most recent champions, defeating BC 2-1 in the 2023 tournament. The four competing schools rotate hosting the women's games.

Northeastern 
The Northeastern Huskies have the most Women's Beanpot wins out of the four teams with 17. Out of the first 13 tournaments, they took home 10 championships, with an eight-win streak from 1984-1991. They most recently won the title in 2023, winning 2-1 against BC and sweeping both men's and women's tournaments for the Huskies.

Harvard 
Harvard won their first Women's Beanpot title at the 4th tournament in 1982, defeating BU 2-1. From the first tournament in 1979 to 1993, Harvard advanced to the championship game 11 out of 15 times and won 4. Since the women's tournament started, 18 of the 43 championship games have been between Harvard and Northeastern. Of those, Harvard has won 7 and Northeastern has won 11. Harvard Crimson's most recently win was in 2022, defeating BC 5-4 and bringing their win total to 15.

Boston College 
Boston College's first two women's championships did not come until the 2006 and 2007 Beanpots, winning back-to-back years against Harvard and BU, respectively. Since 2007, the BC Eagles have advanced to the championship round in 8 tournaments and won 6 more titles. BC has won the Beanpot 8 total times, with their most recent win coming in 2018. The 4-3 overtime win against BU finalized a three-win streak.

Boston University 
BU Terriers have the fewest wins of the usual women's Beanpot teams at 2. Their first title came in 1981 against BC, and their second nearly four decades later in 2019 against Harvard. With their first win, BU defeated BC 4-0, winning the Beanpot while still playing as a club team. Their 3-2 overtime win against Harvard marked their first tournament win playing as a varsity team.

Brown 
Brown University competed in and won their only Women's Beanpot in 1993, replacing Boston University. Brown defeated Harvard in the championship game, winning 2-1.

Other Beanpots
The success of the men's ice hockey tournament has spawned "Beanpot" tournaments in other sports, including basketball, for 14 years ending in 1976, women's ice hockey, baseball (with the University of Massachusetts Amherst replacing Boston University, which does not offer varsity baseball), softball, men's and women's soccer, women's rowing (which also features MIT) and cycling.

The final round of the baseball Beanpot is played at Fenway Park.

A Beanpot for women's rowing was established in 2007, with the crews from Boston College, Boston University, Harvard University (Radcliffe), the Massachusetts Institute of Technology, and Northeastern University competing.

The first Men's Lacrosse Beanpot was held October 19, 2008 at Harvard University. Harvard's Men's Club Team hosted Boston University, Boston College and Northeastern University.

There are also many non-athletic events attached to the Beanpot. These typically occur the same time of year as the hockey beanpot. There is a Concert Band Beanpot, Pep Band Beanpot, Beanpot of Comedy, and a Rice and Beanpot burrito-eating contest, sponsored by Qdoba. The Concert Band Beanpot and Beanpot of Comedy are non-competitive events.

Also, there is the B-School Beanpot Competition, an annual case analysis competition held at Boston University's School of Management since 1996. Undergraduate business schools from the Greater Boston area participate for cash prizes.

The Concert Band Beanpot and Rice and Beanpot participants are the same schools as the men's hockey tournament. The Beanpot of Comedy, hosted by NU & Improv'd of Northeastern University, features sketch and improvisational comedy groups from different schools each year. Past participants have included Boston College, Boston University, Salem State College, Suffolk University, Clark University, and Tufts University. The Business Beanpot participants are Babson College, Boston University, Bentley College, Northeastern University, and Suffolk University. Northeastern University has won ten of the twelve Business Beanpots since 1996, and has taken the top two spots four times. The most recent 1–2 sweep for Northeastern was in 2008.

The Boston College Office of Undergraduate Admission and the Boston University Office of Undergraduate Admission also play in the annual Beancan softball tournament, usually held in July.

On September 26, 2014, the BBC reported that Boston mayor Marty Walsh announced publicly during an official visit to Belfast (Boston's sister city since 2014) that he was supporting a bid to hold a future Beanpot tournament at Odyssey Area in Belfast and that Walsh reportedly will be hosting a delegation from Belfast alongside representatives from the NCAA and the four beanpot schools in October 2014 to further discuss the possibility. However, after a large negative outcry from the Boston media, Walsh later stated that the idea of moving the tournament to a non-Boston venue was taken out of context, and that he only supported "the hosting of a "Beanpot-like" tournament in Belfast that would feature Massachusetts colleges."

All-time results
Four games are listed for each Beanpot, in the order they were played. There are two opening round games, a consolation game featuring the losers of the first two games, and a championship game featuring the winners of the first two games. The teams rotate opening round opponents on a 3-year cycle, so over history every team faces the others an equal number of times during the opening round. Each row represents one Beanpot. Champions are listed in bold. Games requiring one overtime, or ending in a tie or shootout are in pink , while games requiring two or three overtimes are in chartreuse  and cyan , respectively.

† During the 2004–05 season, following Fleet's acquisition by Bank of America and the bank's decision to terminate the naming rights to the arena, there was no permanent naming rights sponsor for that season. It was known as "YourGarden" that year.

‡ Beginning in 2020, NCAA rules determined all Beanpot contests would be officially ruled a tie if games remained scoreless after a five minute overtime period. In 2023, the tournament instituted the use of a shootout to determine game winners after the 5-minute overtime period. From 2020-2022, two games continued play beyond the initial overtime, however statistics were not considered official and only used for tournament placement purposes. One consolation game ended in a tie without continuing beyond the initial overtime.

Winning Streaks

This is a list of all occasions where a Beanpot team has won at least two consecutive championships between years. The current winning streak, if any, is highlighted in chartreuse . Winning streaks with equal numbers of wins are sorted chronologically, with earlier streaks appearing first.

The longest current championship win streak belongs to Boston University, who won six consecutive Beanpots between 1995 and 2000. As of 2022, Harvard is the only team to never win consecutive titles.

Team statistics
Through the 2023 Beanpot, the four teams have amassed the following statistics:

(The tie in the 2022 Consolation game is considered a 3rd place finish for both Boston College and Harvard)

Note: Unofficial statistics from the 2020 tournament are included.

Individual awards
Two awards are presented annually: the Most Valuable Player award and the Eberly Award. The Eberly Award, first presented in 1974, is given annually to the goalie with the best save percentage. The winning goalie must participate in two games to qualify. The award is named after Glen and Dan Eberly, former Beanpot goaltenders at Boston University and Northeastern University, respectively.

Source:

Note: Unofficial statistics from the 2020 tournament are included.

References

External links
 Beanpot Tournament
 Beanpot Tournament History and Timeline
 Beanpot trophy history

1952 establishments in Massachusetts
Annual events in Boston
Boston College Eagles men's ice hockey
Boston University Terriers men's ice hockey
College ice hockey rivalries in the United States
College ice hockey tournaments in the United States
Harvard Crimson men's ice hockey
Northeastern Huskies men's ice hockey
Recurring sporting events established in 1952